Legislative elections were held in South Korea on 25 May 1971. The result was a victory for the Democratic Republican Party, which won 113 of the 204 seats in the National Assembly. Voter turnout was 73.2%.

Results

By city/province

References

Legislative elections in South Korea
South Korea
Legislative